Branimir Jočić (born 10 July 1994) is a Serbian football defender who plays for FK Rudar Pljevlja in Montenegrin First League.

References

External links
 
 Branimir Jočić stats at utakmica.rs 
 
 

1994 births
Living people
Sportspeople from Sombor
Association football midfielders
Serbian footballers
FK Crvenka players
FK Spartak Subotica players
FK Palić players
FK Senta players
FK Rudar Pljevlja players
Serbian SuperLiga players
Montenegrin First League players
Serbian expatriate footballers
Expatriate footballers in Montenegro
Serbian expatriate sportspeople in Montenegro